Aaron Aspin Heremaia (born ) is a New Zealand former professional rugby league footballer who last played as a goal-kicking  or  for the Widnes Vikings in the Super League.

Background
Heremaia was born in Auckland, New Zealand.

Playing career
Educated at Tangaroa College and a Manurewa Marlins junior, Heremaia started his career in 2001 playing for the Hibiscus Coast Raiders in the Bartercard Cup whilst on a New Zealand Warriors development contract. where he played under successful coaches Tony Benson and Brian McClennan. Heremaia however failed to be picked up by the Warriors. In 2004 Heremaia moved to Australia to play in the NSWRL Premier League, where he represented the Western Suburbs Magpies and North Sydney Bears in successive years.

In 2006 he moved to England to play for the Leigh Centurions in the National League One, again linking up with Tony Benson. That year Heremaia was part of the team that won the Northern Rail Cup. He has also conditionally signed but never played for the Widnes Vikings in 2007 and Halifax in 2008.

Returning to New Zealand and the Manurewa Marlins, Heremaia was able to make the Auckland Vulcans team for 2008, playing in the NSW Cup. From here he was able to impress the New Zealand Warriors and was signed to a contract for the 2009 season. He made his first grade début in Round Twelve against the Wests Tigers. He was re-signed by the Warriors until the end of the 2011 season. Heremaia joined Hull F.C. in 2012 on a two-year deal with an option for a third.

On 8 May 2014, Hull F.C. announced that they would release Heremaia at the end of the 2014 season.

One day after Hull announced Aaron would leave at the end of the season, the Widnes Vikings announced he will arrive at the club at the end of the 2014 season to play in 2015.

Representative career
Heremaia played for the Junior Kiwis in 2001. He made his début for the New Zealand Māori side in 2002. He regularly appeared for the side while based in New Zealand and captained New Zealand Māori on several occasions.

For the 2010 Anzac Test, Heremaia was selected to play for New Zealand from the interchange bench in their loss against Australia.

References

External links

Widnes Vikings profile
New Zealand Warriors profile
Leigh Centurions profile
SL profile

1982 births
Living people
Auckland rugby league team players
East Coast Bays Barracudas players
Hibiscus Coast Raiders players
Hull F.C. players
Junior Kiwis players
Leigh Leopards captains
Leigh Leopards players
Manurewa Marlins players
New Zealand Māori rugby league players
New Zealand Māori rugby league team players
New Zealand national rugby league team players
New Zealand rugby league players
New Zealand Warriors players
New Zealand expatriate sportspeople in England
New Zealand expatriate sportspeople in Australia
Newtown Jets NSW Cup players
People educated at Tangaroa College
Rugby league halfbacks
Rugby league hookers
Rugby league players from Auckland
Widnes Vikings players